Faulds or Fauld could refer to different subjects:

 Faulds (plate armour), part of a medieval suit of armour
 RAF Fauld explosion, a disaster during World War II
 RAF Fauld, the site where the above explosion took place